The auto24 Rally Estonia 2014 was the fifth running of the Rally Estonia. The rally was the seventh round of the 2014 European Rally Championship season. The event was won by Ott Tänak & Raigo Mõlder who won 11 stages out of 15.

Report

Classification

Special stages

References

2014 in Estonian sport
2014 European Rally Championship season
Rally Estonia